Matilda Grace Lowther (born 10 July 1995) is a British fashion model.

Early life 
A granddaughter of James Lowther, 7th Earl of Lonsdale, Lowther was born to James and Vanessa Lowther and is the oldest of four siblings. Her grandmother, Nancy Ruth Cobbs, Countess of Lonsdale, was from Pacific Palisades, California. She graduated from Queen Margaret's School, York.

Career 
In her debut season, Lowther opened Burberry's S/S and F/W 2014 fashion shows. She has walked for brands including Miu Miu, Comme des Garçons, The Row, Rodarte, Hermès, and Bottega Veneta. Lowther co-starred with models such as Jourdan Dunn and Lily Donaldson in a Balmain campaign.

Her first cover was for British Vogue’s Miss Vogue (the equivalent of Teen Vogue). She has also been on the cover of Vogue Portugal, Telegraph'''s magazine, and appeared in editorials for British GQ, British Vogue, Vogue Germany, Vogue Japan, Vogue China, Vogue Paris, Vogue Mexico, Interview, Dazed, Elle, WSJ, i-D, W, L'Officiel, and Love''.

References 

Living people
1995 births
English female models
Matilda
People educated at Queen Margaret's School, York
People from Carlisle, Cumbria
English people of American descent